Soto 40 is a  sailboat class designed by Javier Soto Acebal.

Soto 40s were used in the Audi MedCup.

References

2000s sailboat type designs
Sailboat type designs by Argentine designers
Keelboats